is a city located in northern Osaka Prefecture, Japan. As of October 1, 2016, the city has an estimated population of 378,322 and a population density of 9,880 persons per km². The total area is 36.11 km².

The city was founded on April 1, 1940, and was the site of Expo '70, a World's Fair held in 1970. The J-League soccer club Gamba Osaka plays at Suita City Football Stadium.

It is connected to central by Hankyu Railway, West Japan Railway Company and the Osaka Municipal Subway. The Osaka Monorail also passes through the area, connecting the city to Osaka, the Expo Commemoration Park and Osaka International Airport.

Surrounding municipalities
Osaka Prefecture
Osaka (Yodogawa-ku, Higashiyodogawa-ku)
 Settsu
 Ibaraki
 Minoh
 Toyonaka

Economy

Major companies and industries
 Asahi Suita Brewery
 Headquarters of SNK, the producer of Neo Geo arcade boards and games
 Mister Donut, a fast food franchise that offers doughnuts, coffee, muffins and pastries.

Education

Universities
 Kansai University's main branch is located here. It is accessible through Kandaimae Station on the Hankyu Senri Line.
 Osaka University's main administrative campus is hosted here, right beside the Expo Park. It is accessible via the Osaka Monorail at Handaibyoinmae Station, or via Hankyu Senri Line at Kita-Senri Station.
 Osaka Gakuin University, accessible through Kishibe Station on JR Kyoto Line.
Senri Kinran University, accessible through Kita-Senri Station on Hankyu Senri Line.

Student dormitories
Osaka University Foreign Student House
Senri International Student House
Kansai University International Student House
JASSO Student House

Culture

Museums
 National Museum of Ethnology
 International Institute for Children's Literature, Osaka
 The Japan Folk Crafts Museum, Osaka
Kansai University Museum
Suita City Museum

Transportation

Rail 

JR West
JR Kyoto Line:
(<< for Kyoto) - Senrioka - Kishibe - Suita - (for Ōsaka >>)

Hankyu Railway
Hankyu Kyoto Line:
(<< for Kyoto Kawaramachi) - Shojaku - (for Osaka Umeda >>)
Hankyu Senri Line:
(<< for Tenjimbashisuji Rokuchōme, Osaka Municipal Subway Sakaisuji Line) - Suita - Toyotsu - Kandai-mae - Senriyama - Minami-Senri - Yamada - Kita-Senri (line terminus)

Osaka Metro
Midosuji Line (Kita-Osaka Kyuko Railway Namboku Line)
(<< for Umeda, Nakamozu) - Esaka (last stop on the Midosuji Line) - Ryokuchi-koen (in Toyonaka) - Momoyamadai - (for Senri-Chuo >>)

Osaka Monorail
Main Line
(<< for Osaka Airport) - Yamada - Banpaku Kinen Koen - (for Kadoma-shi >>)
Saito Line
(<< for Saito-nishi) - Koen-higashiguchi - Banpaku Kinen Koen (line terminus)

Highways

Sister cities
 Moratuwa, Sri Lanka. Since July 20, 1982.
 Canterbury-Bankstown, New South Wales, Australia. Since May 12, 2016.

Suita was involved in Bankstown's first international Sister City in March 1989.

Notable residents

 Avi Schafer (born 1998), Japanese professional basketball player
 Taro Hakase (born 1968), Japanese violinist and composer

References

External links

 Suita City official website 
 Suita City official website 

 
Cities in Osaka Prefecture